A Twenty20 International is an international cricket match between two representative teams. A Twenty20 International is played under the rules of Twenty20 cricket. First men's Twenty20 International was contested between Australia and New Zealand on 17 February 2005 at Eden Park, Auckland which was won by Australia by 44 runs. In 2005 only 2 T20I matches took place followed by 3 matches in 2006. The number of matches grew in 2007 because of the inaugural Men's Twenty 20 world cup.

In April 2018, the ICC decided to grant full Twenty20 International (T20I) status to all its members. Therefore, all Twenty20 matches played between any ICC members after 1 January 2019 will have T20I status. Hence the number of matches for every calendar year increased a lot.

The following is a list of players who have scored most runs in each of the calendar years starting from 2005, till date. The matches played between 1 January and 31 December (both dates inclusive) of each year, are considered to be part of every calendar year. Till date, Pakistan's Mohammad Rizwan has scored most runs in a calendar year when he finished 2021 with total runs of 1326 from 26 innings.

Key

Most T20I runs in each calendar year
Player list and statistics are updated as of 31 December 2022.

See also
 List of Twenty20 International cricket records

References

Twenty20 International cricket records and statistics